Bukit Bintang may refer to:
Bukit Bintang
Bukit Bintang (federal constituency), represented in the Dewan Rakyat
Bukit Bintang (Selangor federal constituency), former constituency in the Dewan Rakyat 
Bukit Bintang Road

See also
Star Hill AME Church
Starr Hill (disambiguation)